Uelliton da Silva Vieira (born 28 August 1987), simply known as Uelliton, is a Brazilian footballer who plays as a defensive midfielder for Avaí, on loan from Cruzeiro.

References

External links

1987 births
Living people
Brazilian footballers
Campeonato Brasileiro Série A players
Campeonato Brasileiro Série B players
Esporte Clube Vitória players
Cruzeiro Esporte Clube players
Coritiba Foot Ball Club players
Esporte Clube Bahia players
Avaí FC players
Association football midfielders